Jean-Philippe Stassen (born 14 March 1966 in Liège, Belgium) is a Belgian comics creator best known for Deogratias: A Tale of Rwanda.

Biography
Born in Liège to a Flemish father and a Jewish mother, Jean-Philippe Stassen started travelling at a young age. He travelled through Algeria, Morocco, Senegal, Mali, Benin, Ivory Coast, Ghana, Togo, Niger, Nigeria, Burkina Faso, South Africa, Tanzania, Mozambique, Uganda, Burundi and Rwanda. His experiences have been an influence throughout his work.

He was introduced to the magazine L'Écho des Savanes when he was 17 years old. Stassen soon made his debut with the albums Bahamas and Bullwhite at Éditions Albin Michel in 1988 and 1989, both written by Denis Lapière.

Stassen and Lapière continued their collaboration in the collection Aire Libre of Dupuis, where they created the diptych Le Bar du Vieux Français in 1992. The story won them several prizes.

Stassen then wrote Louis le Portugais on his own, another touching human tragedy, this time situated in the suburbs of Liège . He then changed the setting of this stories to Africa again, and created Thérèse. This was followed by Déogratias, about the genocide in Rwanda, and Les Enfants.

Jean-Philippe Stassen currently lives and works in Rwanda.

Bibliography

English
His comics work in English include:
Deogratias: A Tale of Rwanda, First Second Books, New York, 2006.

French
His comics work in French include:
 Bahamas (with Denis Lapière), Éditions Albin Michel, Paris, 1988
 Bullwhite (with Denis Lapière), Éditions Albin Michel, Paris, 1989
 Le Bar du vieux Français (with Denis Lapière), Dupuis, Marcinelle
 Tome 1, 1992
 Tome 2, 1993
 Intégrale, 1999
 Louis le Portugais, Dupuis, Marcinelle, 1998
 Thérèse, Dupuis, Marcinelle, 1999
 Déogratias, Dupuis, Marcinelle, 2000. 
 Pawa : Chronique des monts de la Lune, Delcourt, Paris, 2002
 Les Enfants, éd. Dupuis, Marcinelle, 2004
 Nous avons tué le chien teigneux (Luis Bernardo Honwana), Chandeigne, Paris, 2006
 Cœur des ténèbres (Heart of Darkness, Joseph Conrad, with Sylvain Venayre), Gallimard, Paris, 2006
 Les visiteurs de Gibraltar (in XXI, N°1), Paris, 2008

See also
Bibliography of the Rwandan Genocide

References

Jean-Philippe Stassen at Bedetheque 
Jean-Philippe Stassen at Lambiek's Comiclopedia

External links
 Jean-Philippe Stassen biography (Dupuis website)
 Biography and bibliography (Delcourt website – French)
 The Rwandan genocide d'après la bande dessinée by Jo Ellen Fair

Belgian graphic novelists
Living people
Writers from Liège
1966 births